Moravice is a municipality and village in Opava District in the Moravian-Silesian Region of the Czech Republic. It has about 200 inhabitants. It lies on the left bank of the Moravice River.

Gallery

References

External links

Villages in Opava District